Marcus Foligno (born August 10, 1991) is an American-born Canadian professional ice hockey winger and alternate captain for the Minnesota Wild of the National Hockey League (NHL). Nicknamed “Moose” He was selected 104th overall by the Buffalo Sabres in the 2009 NHL Entry Draft.

Playing career
As a youth, Foligno played in the 2003 Quebec International Pee-Wee Hockey Tournament with a minor ice hockey team from Hershey, Pennsylvania.

Junior
Foligno was selected by the Ontario Hockey League (OHL)'s Sudbury Wolves in the second round, 39th overall, in the 2007 OHL Priority Selection, the same team that drafted his older brother, Nick. After two seasons with the club, Foligno was selected in the fourth round, 104th overall, by the Buffalo Sabres in the 2009 NHL Entry Draft. Foligno spent an additional two seasons with the Wolves, with his best coming during the 2010–11 season, in which he recorded 23 goals and 59 points in 47 games.

Buffalo Sabres

Foligno agreed to terms on an entry-level professional contract with the Buffalo Sabres on May 25, 2011. He began play with the Sabres' American Hockey League (AHL) affiliate, the Rochester Americans, in the 2011–12 season. Foligno was called up to the Sabres on December 19, 2011, and made his NHL debut on December 20, playing against the Ottawa Senators, the team his brother Nick Foligno was playing with at the time. Marcus Foligno's second career start came March 10, 2012, again against his brother and the Ottawa Senators. Foligno scored his first career goal at 14:06 in the third period, which tied the game; Buffalo eventually won the game in a shootout.

Like his brother Nick, Marcus Foligno used their father's "Foligno Leap" as his first career goal celebration. However, on Marcus' first goal, he was unsure he actually scored. As a result, Marcus used the "Leap" on his next goal in Buffalo on March 14, 2012.

Foligno broke the family tradition and did not choose the numbers 17 (worn by his father) or 71 (worn by his brother). Upon being drafted by the Sabres, he elected to wear number 82 (assigned to him at camp) instead of his father's number 17. Foligno was reassigned to the Americans immediately before the 2012–13 NHL lockout. However, this changed once he was traded to the Minnesota Wild, where he chose to wear the number 17.

On June 27, 2016, the Sabres issued a qualifying offer to Foligno. He was signed to a one-year contract on July 14, 2016. In the 2016–17 season, Foligno scored a career-best 13 goals in a checking-line role to match his 23 points from the previous season.

Minnesota Wild
As a restricted free agent, on June 30, 2017, Foligno was traded (along with Tyler Ennis and a third-round pick in the 2018 NHL Entry Draft) to the Minnesota Wild in exchange for Marco Scandella, Jason Pominville and a fourth-round pick in 2018. On September 14, the Wild signed Foligno to a four-year, $11.5 million contract extension worth $2.875 million annually. Foligno was hospitalized on October 12, 2017, after taking a punch to the face from Chicago Blackhawks forward John Hayden during a fight in Minnesota's 5–2 win. According to The Athletic's Michael Russo, he may have suffered a "broken facial bone" as a result of the hit.

On January 12, 2021, Foligno signed a three-year, $9.5 million extension with the Wild.

International play

Approaching his final junior season in the OHL with the Sudbury Wolves, Foligno was Invited to take part in Canada's 2011 national junior team selection camp for the 2011 World Junior Ice Hockey Championships. Making a positive impression, he was later selected to Canada's roster for the tournament, held in his birthplace of Buffalo, New York. He completed the tournament with two goals and four points in seven games as Canada claimed the silver medal.

Personal life
Foligno was born in Buffalo, New York, the son of former NHL player and Buffalo Sabre Mike Foligno and Janis Foligno. Janis died of breast cancer in July 2009. Although Marcus was born in the United States, both of his parents are Canadian, making him a dual citizen; Foligno played for Canada in the 2011 World Junior Championship. Marcus is the younger brother of former Columbus Blue Jacket captain and current Boston Bruin Nick Foligno. He also has two sisters, Lisa Foligno-Carey (married to Dan Carey) and Cara Foligno. Cara works in Buffalo, and Lisa works in Peterborough, Ontario. Foligno married Natascia Marcantognini on July 15, 2016 in Sudbury, ON.

Career statistics

Regular season and playoffs

International

Awards and honours

References

External links

1991 births
Living people
American men's ice hockey left wingers
Buffalo Sabres draft picks
Buffalo Sabres players
Canadian ice hockey left wingers
Ice hockey people from Buffalo, New York
Ice hockey people from Ontario
Minnesota Wild players
Rochester Americans players
Sportspeople from Greater Sudbury
Sudbury Wolves players